United Nations Security Council Resolution 336, adopted on July 18, 1973, after examining the application of the Bahamas for membership in the United Nations, the Council recommended to the General Assembly that the Bahamas be admitted.

See also
 List of United Nations Security Council Resolutions 301 to 400 (1971–1976)

References
Text of the Resolution at undocs.org

External links
 

 0336
United Nations Security Council resolutions concerning Bahamas
1973 in the Bahamas
Foreign relations of the Bahamas
 0336
July 1973 events